Whig Hill is a historic home located near Plainville, Onondaga County, New York.  The main house was built in 1833, and is a -story, five-bay, Greek Revival-style brick dwelling with a nearly flat roof.  Whig Hill was the principal element within a listing Whig Hill and Dependencies, which included two barn clusters, a tenant house, and other outbuildings.  The barn cluster north of Genesee Street, described in 1975, is no longer present, in 2009.  The south barn remains.

It was listed on the National Register of Historic Places in 1975.

References

External links

Houses on the National Register of Historic Places in New York (state)
Historic American Buildings Survey in New York (state)
Greek Revival houses in New York (state)
Houses completed in 1833
Houses in Onondaga County, New York
National Register of Historic Places in Onondaga County, New York